The 2007 Nigerian House of Representatives elections in Nasarawa State was held on April 21, 2007, to elect members of the House of Representatives to represent Nasarawa State, Nigeria.

Overview

Summary

Results

Nasarawa/Toto 
PDP candidate Samuel Egya won the election, defeating other party candidates.

Lafia/Obi 
PDP candidate Mohammed Al-Makura won the election, defeating other party candidates.

Keffi/Karu/Kokona  
PDP candidate Ahmed D. Aliyu won the election, defeating other party candidates.

Awe/Doma/Keana 
PDP candidate Abdullahi S. Hashimu won the election, defeating other party candidates.

Akwanga/Nasarawa/Eggon/Wamba 
PDP candidate Zakari Abdullahi Idde won the election, defeating other party candidates.

References 

Nasarawa State House of Representatives elections